Derrick Simmons is an American actor, film director, producer, stunt artist, music producer and entrepreneur.

Early life 

Derrick Simmons was born in Queens, New York. He attended Harbor JHS of Performing Arts in Harlem, New York and later attended Talent Unlimited High School where he majored in drama.

Career
Derrick Simmons started his acting career at age 10 by appearing in a National Burger King commercial where he appeared opposite Stacey Dash.

As a stuntman has performed in more than 175 films. He wrote, produced and directed three films, and as an actor he has performed in around 40 titles.

Main works 
Simmons has worked as actor and stuntman in various television programs such as Law & Order, New York Undercover, The Wire, Third Watch, Oz, Hack, The Sopranos, Law & Order SVU, The David Letterman Show, Saturday Night Live, 30 Rock, The Good Wife, Orange is the New Black, House of Cards.

Some of Simmons's feature film credits include Deja Vu, American Gangster, A Bonx Tale, Tower Heist, Ray (where he stunt doubled Jamie Foxx as Ray Charles), Spike Lee's Inside Man, Precious, Find Me Guilty, The Purge: Election Year and Teenage Mutant Ninja Turtles.

Film production 
Derrick Simmons production company Derrick Simmons Film Works has produced three feature film titles. Jump Offs (2007), Women Do it Better (2009) and Nobody's Perfect (2016), hosted by Cannes World Cinema Initiative.

Music production 
Derrick is CEO of Phat Tune Recording.

Awards and recognitions 
Simmons won the best feature film award at the Mt Vernon Film Festival and the best director award at Pocono Mountains Film Festival.

In 2016 he was nominated as a member of the stunts crew of The Blacklist in the category Outstanding Action Performance by a Stunt Ensemble in a Television Series in the Screen Actors Guild Awards.

References

External links
Official Website of Derrick Simmons

Action choreographers
African-American film directors
African-American film producers
African-American male actors
African-American screenwriters
Film producers from New York (state)
Record producers from New York (state)
American stunt performers
20th-century American male actors
21st-century American male actors
American male comedians
American male film actors
American male television actors
American music industry executives
Year of birth missing (living people)
Screenwriters from New York (state)
Businesspeople from Queens, New York
Film directors from New York City
Living people
Male actors from New York City
Rappers from New York City
Writers from Queens, New York
Comedians from New York City
20th-century American comedians
21st-century American comedians
21st-century American rappers
20th-century African-American male singers
21st-century African-American musicians